The Kálfsvísa ("Kálfr's vísa", Kálfr being maybe the name of its author) is a poem partially preserved in Snorri Sturluson’s Skáldskaparmál.
 
Its three stanzas in fornyrðislag mostly consist of a þula of horses and their riders, Germanic heroes (for instance Grani and Sigurðr). The Kálfsvísa also includes a narrative dealing with the Battle on the Ice of Lake Vänern between Áli and Aðils.

Notes

External links
 The Kálfsvísa in the original language.

Sources of Norse mythology
Skaldic poems